Rafael Fernández may refer to:
 Rafael Fernández Reyes (1897–?), Chilean general and fencer
 Rafael Fernández Álvarez (1913–2010), Spanish politician and former political exile
 Rafael Fernández Pérez (born 1980), Spanish futsal player who plays for ElPozo Murcia as a goalkeeper
 Rafael Fernández Martínez (born 1989), known as Chumbi, Spanish footballer who plays for UD Almería, mainly as a forward
 Rafael Fernandez (baseball, born 1988), Dominican baseball coach
 Rafael Eduardo Fernández, Mexican footballer

See also
 Rafael Fernandes (disambiguation)